Dan Buckley is an American publishing executive, who is known for his work as Publisher, and then as President of Marvel Entertainment since January 2017.

Early life
Dan Buckley was raised in upstate New York and later a New York city resident. He graduated in 1989 with a Bachelor of Arts degree in economics from St. Lawrence University. Buckley continued his studies at Rensselaer Polytechnic Institute which granted him an MBA in Marketing and International Relations in 1991.  As a part of his studies at Rensselaer, he took a stint through MBA Exchange Program with the International University of Japan which allowed him to study in Japan.

Career
In 1990, Buckley joined Marvel Enterprise, where he served in different positions from new product development to international publishing. His last position was as vice president of marketing services in 1997.

In 1997, Buckley left for a position at Omnicom's Radiate Group, Inc. His last position at Radiate was as vice president of operations and communications in 2003. At that time, he resided in Florida.

Buckley returned to the New York Metro area from Florida in October 2003 when he was named Marvel Enterprises publisher in 2003. By June 28, 2010, Buckley added the position of president of the print, animation & digital divisions of Marvel Worldwide to his publisher title. On January 18, 2017, he was promoted to President of Marvel Entertainment from president for TV, publishing and brand.

References

External links

Living people
Marvel Entertainment people
Year of birth missing (living people)
St. Lawrence University alumni
Rensselaer Polytechnic Institute alumni
Marvel Comics people